Wyandot is an unincorporated community in Wyandot County, in the U.S. state of Ohio.

History
A schoolhouse was in operation at Wyandot by 1828. A post office called Wyandot opened in 1837, and was discontinued in 1905. Dr. Charles E. Sawyer, the personal physician of Warren G. Harding, was born in Wyandot in 1860.

References

Unincorporated communities in Wyandot County, Ohio
Unincorporated communities in Ohio
1828 establishments in Ohio